The Madhurāṣṭakam, also spelt as Madhurashtakam, is a Sanskrit octet in devotion of Lord Krishna, composed by the Hindu Bhakti saint Sri Vallabhacharya. Sri Vallabhacharya was a Telugu Brahmin who propagated Pushtimarg, which emphasizes on the unconditional bhakti and seva of Krishna. According to ancient texts and accounts when Sri Krishna himself appeared in front of Vallabhacharya, on midnight of Sravana Sukla Ekadasi, Vallabhacharya composed the Madhurashtakam in praise of the lord. He created many other literary pieces including the Vyasa Sutra Bhashya, Jaimini Sutra Bhasya, Bhagavata Subodhini Tika, Pushti Pravala Maryada and Siddhanta Rahasya etc. in Sanskrit.

The devotional hymn "Madhurāṣṭakam" of Sri Vallabhacarya was created to lead the devotee in Pustimarga, the Path of Grace, which involves a constant love-filled devotion to Krishna by various acts of homage, such as singing (kirtana), remembering (smarana), conceptualising and beholding (darshana) a beatific image of the deity and offering of services (seva). These acts enable the devotee to enter into the divine presence of Sri Krishna and to experience the Lord's real essence (svarupa) which are in fact, succinctly laid down by the Madhurāṣṭakam. Hence, Madhurāṣṭakam plays an instrumental role in the realisation of the Lord.

Aṣṭakam as a Form and a Genre

The term aṣṭakam is derived from the Sanskrit word , meaning "eight". An aṣṭakam is made up of eight stanzas.

Aṣṭakam belong to the genre of lyric poetry, which tends to be short, extremely melodic, and contemplative. It reflects and portrays the poet's own feelings, states of mind, and perceptions about the theme or character in the aṣṭakam.

Context
The thought behind the composition in 'Bhakti mixed with Love', being a typical frame of devotion and dedication in the Bhakti movement. In the loved bhakti frame, the devotee falls in love with the almighty and to the devotee, all the attributes and actions of the Lord God appears sweet, as those appear to a lover.

The Madhurāṣṭakam deals with the qualities and deeds of Lord Krishna, all of which have been conceptualized as being dipped in madhu, meaning honey or nectar. In the eyes of the devotee, everything that pertains to Lord is sweet and graceful, he being the adhipati (Lord and Godhead) of all sweetness.

The body of the Madhurāṣṭakam includes many qualities, attributes and motifs associated with Krishna, including the venu flute, cows, the Yamuna river, gopis, and Krishna's lila. These symbols and motifs related to the life and deeds of Lord Sri Krishna have been labelled as 'sweet' in the astakam.

Text
See Sanskrit for details of pronunciation.

Gujarati meaning:

अधरं मधुरं वदनं मधुरं नयनं मधुरं हसितं मधुरम्। 

हदयं मधुरं गमनं मधुरं मधुराधिपतेरखिलं मधुरम्॥१॥

શ્રી કૃષ્ણના મધુર મુખ પર આવેલ મધુર હાસ્ય વડે તેમના  હોઠ અને આંખો દ્વારા માધુર્ય છલકાય છે. તેના દર્શનથી ભક્તોના મધુર હૃદયની ગતિ પણ મધુર થઇ જાય છે. (દર્શનથી ભક્તો પુલકિત થઇ જાય છે) આમ આ સૃષ્ટિ પરના સકળ  માધુર્યના અધિપતિ (રાજા) શ્રી કૃષ્ણનું સર્વસ્વ મધુર છે.   

वचनं मधुरं चरितं मधुरं वसनं मधुरं वलितं मधुरम्। 

चलितं मधुरं भ्रमितं मधुरं मधुराधिपतेरखिलं मधुरम्  ॥२॥

શ્રી કૃષ્ણના ભક્તો, શ્રી કૃષ્ણની મધુર વાતો, મધુર ચરિત્રો, તેમના મધુર (સુંદર) વસ્ત્રો, તેમના મરોડદાર મધુર અંગો વડે તેઓ જે મધુર ભ્રમણ કરે છે તેનું ગાન કરતા કહે છે કે આ સૃષ્ટિ પરના સકળ માધુર્યના અધિપતિ (રાજા) શ્રી કૃષ્ણનું સર્વસ્વ મધુર છે.    

वेणुर्मधुरो रेणुर्मधुर: पाणिर्मधुर: पादौ मधुरौ। 

नृत्यं मधुरं सख्यं मधुरं मधुराधिपतेरखिलं मधुरम्॥३॥ 

શ્રી કૃષ્ણ જયારે પોતાના મધુર હાથોમાં પોતાની મધુર વાંસળી પકડી પોતાના મધુર પગ પૃથ્વિ પર મૂકે છે ત્યારે પૃથ્વિ ની તમામ રજકણો મધુર થઇ જાય છે. વળી શ્રી કૃષ્ણ જ્યારે મધુર નૃત્ય કરે છે ત્યારે તેમનો સાથ ગોપીઓને મધુર લાગે છે. આમ આ સૃષ્ટિ પરના સકળ  માધુર્યના અધિપતિ (રાજા) શ્રી કૃષ્ણનું સર્વસ્વ મધુર છે.      

गीतं मधुरं पीतं मधुरं भुक्तं मधुरं सुप्तं मधुरम्। 

रुपं मधुरं तिलकं मधुरं मधुराधिपतेरखिलं मधुरम्॥४॥

શ્રી કૃષ્ણના મધુર ગીતોનું મધુર પાન કરીને ભક્તોને મધુર ભોજન કર્યાનો આનંદ થાય છે તેથી તેઓ મધુર નિન્દ્રાનો અનુભવ કરે છે અને તેઓ શ્રી કૃષ્ણના મધુર રુપના ઓવારણા લઈને મધુર તિલક કરી કહે છે કે આ સૃષ્ટિ પરના સકળ  માધુર્યના અધિપતિ (રાજા) શ્રી કૃષ્ણનું સર્વસ્વ મધુર છે. 

करणं मधुरं तरणं मधुरं हरणं मधुरं रमणं मधुरम्।

वमितं मधुरं शमितं मधुरं मधुराधिपतेरखिलं मधुरम् ॥५॥

શ્રી કૃષ્ણના ભક્તોને શ્રી કૃષ્ણના મધુર (સેવા) કાર્યો કરવાથી આ સંસાર સાગરમાં તરવુ મધુર લાગે છે. શ્રી કૃષ્ણ તેમના તમામ દુન્યવી સુખોનું મધુરતાથી હરણ કરી લે છે તો પણ શ્રી કૃષ્ણના ભક્તોના તન-મનમાં મધુર આનંદ થાય છે. અને તેઓ શ્રી કૃષ્ણના ચરિત્રો નુ વર્ણન મધુર ઉદ્ ગારો થી કે પછી મધુર શાંતિથી કરે છે કારણકે આ સૃષ્ટિ પરના સકળ  માધુર્યના અધિપતિ (રાજા) શ્રી કૃષ્ણનું સર્વસ્વ મધુર છે.       

गुन्जा मधुरा माला मधुरा यमुना मधुरा वीची मधुरा। 

सलिलं मधुरं कमलं मधुरं मधुराधिपतेरखिलं मधुरम् ॥६॥

મધુર લહેરો વાળા મધુર યમુનાના મધુર પાણીમાં ઉગેલા મધુર કમળોની મધુર કળીઓની મધુર માળા શ્રી કૃષ્ણએ પહેરેલી છે. તેવા આ સૃષ્ટિ પરના સકળ  માધુર્યના અધિપતિ (રાજા) શ્રી કૃષ્ણનું સર્વસ્વ મધુર છે.  

गोपी मधुरा लीला मधुरा युक्तं मधुरं मुक्तं मधुरम्। 

दृष्टं मधुरं शिष्टं मधुरं मधुराधिपतेरखिलं मधुरम्॥७॥ 

મધુર ગોપીઓ સાથે શ્રી કૃષ્ણએ કરેલી લીલા મધુર છે. ગોપીઓને શ્રી કૃષ્ણનો સંયોગ મધુર લાગે છે અને વિયોગ પણ મધુર લાગે છે. કારણકે વિયોગમાં ગોપીઓને તેમનું મધુર ચિંતન (નિરિક્ષણ) કરવામાં કોઇ મધુર શિષ્ટાચાર કરવો પડતો નથી કારણકે આ સૃષ્ટિ પરના સકળ  માધુર્યના અધિપતિ (રાજા) શ્રી કૃષ્ણનું સર્વસ્વ મધુર છે.   

गोपा मधुरा गावो मधुरा यष्टिर्मधुरा सृष्टिर्मधुरा। 

दलितं मधुरं फलितं मधुरं मधुराधिपतेरखिलं मधुरम्॥८॥

શ્રી કૃષ્ણ જ્યારે મધુર ગોવાળો સાથે મધુર ગાયો ને ચરાવવા મધુર લાકડી લઈને ચાલે છે ત્યારે સૃષ્ટિ મધુર લાગે છે. શ્રી કૃષ્ણનો ભાર પૃથ્વિને  મધુર લાગે છે તેથી તે દબાયેલી હોવા છતા ફળદ્રુપ બની મધુર ફલ આપે છે કારણકે આ સૃષ્ટિ પરના સકળ  માધુર્યના અધિપતિ (રાજા) શ્રી કૃષ્ણનું સર્વસ્વ મધુર છે.

॥ ઇતિ શ્રીમદ્ વલ્લભાચાર્ય વિરચિતં મધુરાષ્ટ્કમ સંપૂર્ણમ ॥

In popular culture
Madhurāṣṭakam has been a very popular devotional song. Renowned singers, including the classical legend M. S. Subbulakshmi and semi-classical singer K. J. Yesudas have given classical and semi-classical renditions of the song. In the Odissi dance tradition, the Madhurāṣṭakam comprises an elegant and intoxicating theme for dance drama.

See also
Adi Sankara
Vallabha Acharya

References

 Madhurashtakam lyrics
http://gujaratikavitaquotes.blogspot.com/2019/03/blog-post.html

External links
Vaishnav Parivar : A informative portal about Pushtimarg, Vaishnavism
Vallabha Acharya (boloji.com)
Acharya Vallabha and His Pushti Sampradaya (neovedanta)

Odissi
Vaishnavism